Lars Anders Tomter (born 30 November 1959) is a Norwegian viola player. He plays on a 1590 Gasparo da Salò viola.

References

1959 births
Living people
Norwegian classical violists
Place of birth missing (living people)
Norwegian male musicians